The 2002 Russian First Division was the 11th edition of Russian First Division. There were 18 teams.

League table

See also
2002 Russian Premier League

References
 PFL

2
Russian First League seasons
Russia
Russia